Filipino singer-actress and television host Jolina Magdangal has released eight studio albums, nine soundtrack albums, two compilation albums, one remix album and a number of singles and promotional recordings.

Magdangal began her career as a member of the world-renowned composer Ryan Cayabyab's singing group 14K. In 1996, she was chosen by Walt Disney Records as its first Filipino recording artist to sing the theme songs of Pocahontas and The Hunchback of Notre Dame for local promotion. On the same year, Magdangal released her debut studio album A Wish Comes True under Walt Disney Records and distributed by Universal Records (Philippines). Still in 1996, she was featured in several Star Records (now Star Music) soundtrack albums releasing movie promotional recordings such as Minsan Sa Ating Buhay (1996) for Magic Temple and Hintayin Mo Lang (1996) for Ang TV Movie: The Adarna Adventure.

Even before releasing studio albums that went multi-platinum, Magdangal has been the voice behind the theme songs of various movies and television programs. With an array of theme song hits synonymously associated to her, Magdangal is known in the Philippines as the undisputed movie theme song and soundtrack queen.

In 1997, Magdangal released her sophomore studio album Jolina, her first under Star Records. The album contains original cuts along with previously recorded songs from her movie soundtracks. By the end of the year 1997, the album was certified Quadruple Platinum (4× Platinum) by the Philippine Association of the Record Industry (PARI) and was declared as the biggest selling album of the year 1997. Eventually, the album received a 7× Platinum certification for selling more than 280,000 units.

Her follow up album, On Memory Lane (2000), was even a bigger surprise. When local artists were doing an all-revival album by exploring the music mines of the '80s and the '70s, Magdangal joined the revival bandwagon through On Memory Lane by traipsing across the '50s and the '60s in her own take. Not only the album contains songs coming from periods considered as the golden age of popular music, the booklet in its packaging also delivered a take on the nostalgia craze when Magdangal was costumed as a World War II beauty and photographed in other period costumes. Following the commercial success of the album Jolina, On Memory Lane was certified Gold Record by PARI after three days of its release, and eventually achieved a 6× Platinum certification for selling more than 240,000 units. More to that, the album was praised by critics and hailed as one of the finest albums ever released in the Philippine music industry.

Her self-titled album, Jolina, and all-revival album, On Memory Lane, are listed among the best selling albums of all time in the Philippines.

In 2002, Magdangal had a smooth metamorphosis from a youth kiddie pop star to a grown-up artist through her album Jolina Sings the Masters. Not only the album featured a more matured and subdued Jolina - no more bangs and too much frills - but also Magdangal interpreted the compositions with mature emotions. Said album is considered as a first in local recording industry for putting up together master composers in the country in a single album.

Through her music, Magdangal has travelled not only the Islands of the Philippines but also the East and West Coasts of the United States, Hawaii, Guam, Saipan, Canada, Australia, Europe, The Middle East and Asia.

In 2002, Magdangal transferred to GMA Network. After a year, she was chosen to be the banner artist of the then newly built GMA Records through the company's initial album offering, Forever Jolina. Her next two albums were released under GMA Records in 2006 and 2008.

In 2003, Magdangal was selected to represent the Philippines in the Japan-ASEAN Pop Festival held at Yokohama, Japan. The concept and aim of J-ASEAN POPs is to find synergy among the diverse cultures of Japan and the ASEAN countries and to bring about a sense of togetherness and community among a wide range of people who support it, through exchanges in popular music.

Magdangal took a seven-year hiatus in the recording industry since releasing her last GMA Records album Destiny in 2008. In 2014, she came back to ABS-CBN, and after a year, she released her come back album Back To Love via digital download. The physical album was released on February 15, 2016, and after two weeks in the market, her come back album was certified Gold Record by PARI.

As of 2016, Star Music executive and producer Rouqe Rox Santos claims that Magdangal still holds the title Star Music Queen of Pop and the Original Queen of Star Music due to the number of albums that turned gold and quadruple platinum.

Studio albums 

Note: Figures on units sales are based on Philippine Association of the Record Industry's existing thresholds during the year the albums were released. Adjustments for inflation are not reflected in this article.

Soundtrack albums 

Note: Figures on units sales are based on Philippine Association of the Record Industry's existing thresholds during the year the albums were released. Adjustments for inflation are not reflected in this article.

Remix album 

Note: Figures on units sales are based on Philippine Association of the Record Industry's existing thresholds during the year the albums were released. Adjustments for inflation are not reflected in this article.

Karaoke album

Compilation albums 

Note: Figures on units sales are based on Philippine Association of the Record Industry's existing thresholds during the year the albums were released. Adjustments for inflation are not reflected in this article.

Singles, soundtracks, and promotional recordings

Other appearances

Notes

References

Discographies of Filipino artists